Briggs was an electoral district of the House of Assembly in the Australian state of South Australia from 1985 to 1993. The district was based in the northern suburbs of Adelaide.

Briggs was a safe Labor seat. It was abolished in 1993, with sitting member Mike Rann successfully moving to the nearby seat of Ramsay. Much of the Briggs area was then represented by the new seat of Wright.

Member for Briggs

Election results

External links
1985 & 1989 election boundaries, page 18 & 19

Former electoral districts of South Australia
1985 establishments in Australia
1993 disestablishments in Australia
Constituencies established in 1985
Constituencies disestablished in 1993